MAZE: Solve the World's Most Challenging Puzzle (1985, Henry Holt and Company) is a puzzle book written and illustrated by Christopher Manson. The book was originally published as part of a contest to win $10,000.

Unlike other puzzle books, each page is involved in solving the book's riddle. Specifically, each page represents a room or space in a hypothetical house, and each room leads to other "rooms" in this "house." Part of the puzzle involves reaching the center of the house, Room #45 (which is page 45 in the book), and back to Room #1 in only sixteen steps. Some rooms lead to circuitous loops; others lead nowhere. This gives the puzzle the feel of a maze or labyrinth.

The book was adapted as the computer game Riddle of the Maze in 1994 by Interplay. This version featured full color illustrations and voice-overs for the narrator.

The contest has been void since 1987, but the book may still be purchased.

Parts of the Puzzle
As Manson describes, this puzzle book "is not really a book,” but "a building in the shape of a book . . . a maze," whereby "Each numbered page depicts a room in the maze.” There are forty-five "rooms" (pages) in the Maze (book). In addition, "The doors in each room lead to other rooms.” With this structure established, Manson challenges readers to solve three tasks: to journey from Room #1 to Room #45 and back to Room #1 in only sixteen steps, to interpret the riddle hidden in Room #45 based on visual and verbal clues, and to find the solution to this riddle hidden along the shortest possible path found in the first task.

The Contest
A contest to win $10,000 was released with the book in October, 1985. The contest ended September 1, 1987, which was an extension of the original contest deadline. In early January 1988, Ventura Associates, Inc. sent a letter to the winners of the contest stating that twelve entrants "were equally close to guessing the correct solutions." The $10,000 prize was split between these twelve, all of whom discovered the correct path, but not the solution to the riddle.

If inquired before November 1, 1987, Ventura Associates would have sent one or two letters containing clues to the Riddle found in Room #45.

Letter #1

 Three things should be thrown out;
 Three things come in pairs.
 You'll find two people in the room;
 They must sit in one chair.

Letter #2:

I’ll tip my hat if the two of you can solve this.
You can get into these two shoes only if you don’t go anywhere.
You will find two names on the table, and they go together like doughnut and hole.
You must choose between two pictures.
There are no two ways you can read this sign.
You can see that another two pictures demonstrate their own kind of symmetry.

References

External links
IntoTheAbyss.net. A community forum devoted to visual puzzles, especially Christopher Manson's MAZE.
Mazecast. A YouTube podcast about Christopher Manson's MAZE.
. An excerpt from an article about MAZE in relation to the future of books.
 Escaping the Maze, the "world's most challenging puzzle" -- Boing Boing 
 Maze: beautiful, inspirational, unsolvable -- Jason McIntosh
 Maze by Christopher Manson -- Said Cunning Fury

Puzzle books
1985 books
Henry Holt and Company books